Bérgson Gustavo Silveira da Silva (born 9 February 1991), simply known as Bérgson, is a Brazilian professional footballer who plays as a striker for Malaysia Super League club Johor Darul Ta'zim.

Career

Grêmio
Bérgson began his career at Grêmio in 2006. In 2007 played his first Campeonato Brasileiro Sub-20 and its first Copa São Paulo de Futebol Júnior, one of the highlights of the campaign team of the gaúcho. In 2009, he was promoted to the professional squad, having few chances in the team for their lack of experience and competition with players from more reputed in national football. In 2010, Bergson still suffers from the competition because the Grêmio is full of attackers, as Borges, Leandro and William.

Suwon Bluewings (loan)
On 1 January 2011 he joined South Korean giants Suwon Bluewings on loan.

Vila Nova (loan)
On 1 July 2011, he joined Vila Nova on loan.

Ypiranga (loan)
On 1 February 2012, he joined Ypiranga on loan.

Braga B (loan)
On 1 July 2012, he joined Portuguese side Braga B on loan.

Juventude (loan)
On 1 January 2013, he joined Juventude on loan.

Portuguesa (loan)
On 1 August 2013, he joined Portuguesa on loan.

Chapecoense (loan)
On 1 January 2014, he joined Chapecoense on loan.

Busan IPark (loan)
On 6 January 2015, he joined South Korean side Busan IPark on loan.

Náutico (loan)
On 10 July 2015, he joined Náutico on loan.

Náutico
On 28 January 2016, after a long term of loan series, he finally left Grêmio and joined Náutico on a free transfer.

Paysandu
On 19 January 2017, he joined Paysandu on a free transfer.

Athletico Paranaense
On 1 January 2018, he joined Athletico Paranaense on a free transfer.

Ceará
On 26 April 2019, he joined Ceará on a free transfer.

Fortaleza
On 15 October 2020, he joined Fortaleza on a free transfer.

Johor Darul Ta'zim (loan)
On 2 March 2021, he joined Malaysian side Johor Darul Ta'zim on loan. On 13 March 2021, Bergson scored his first goal for Johor Darul Ta'zim in an away league match against UiTM. Johor won the match 0–4. On 31 July 2021, Bergson scored his first hat-trick for the club in a home league match against Perak where Johor won 5–0. He went on to score 23 league goals for the club, which is also the club record in a single season.

Johor Darul Ta'zim
On 19 May 2021, after a successful spell, he signed with the club on a permanent deal.

Career statistics

Honours
Grêmio
Campeonato Gaúcho: 2010

Paysandu
Campeonato Paraense: 2017

Athletico Paranaense
Copa Sudamericana: 2018

Ceará
Copa do Nordeste: 2020

Johor Darul Ta'zim
Malaysia Super League: 2021, 2022
Malaysia FA Cup: 2022
Malaysia Cup: 2022
Malaysia Charity Shield: 2022, 2023

Individual 
Johor Darul Ta'zim
Malaysia Super League Top Scorer: 2022
Best Foreign Player – Malaysia National Football Awards: 2022
Malaysia Cup Top Scorer: 2022
IFFHS CONMEBOL Men's Best Goal Scorer: 2022

IFFHS All Domestic Competitions Scoring Streak: 2022
IFFHS 2nd Men's World Best Serial League Goal Scorer: 2022

References

External links

1991 births
Living people
Sportspeople from Rio Grande do Sul
Brazilian footballers
Association football forwards
Campeonato Brasileiro Série A players
Campeonato Brasileiro Série B players
Campeonato Brasileiro Série D players
Grêmio Foot-Ball Porto Alegrense players
Vila Nova Futebol Clube players
Ypiranga Futebol Clube players
Esporte Clube Juventude players
Associação Portuguesa de Desportos players
Associação Chapecoense de Futebol players
Clube Náutico Capibaribe players
Paysandu Sport Club players
Club Athletico Paranaense players
Ceará Sporting Club players
Fortaleza Esporte Clube players
K League 1 players
Suwon Samsung Bluewings players
Busan IPark players
Liga Portugal 2 players
S.C. Braga B players
Johor Darul Ta'zim F.C. players
Brazilian expatriate footballers
Brazilian expatriate sportspeople in South Korea
Brazilian expatriate sportspeople in Portugal
Expatriate footballers in South Korea
Expatriate footballers in Portugal
Brazilian expatriate sportspeople in Malaysia
Expatriate footballers in Malaysia